The New Albany School District is a public school district based in New Albany, Mississippi (USA).

The district includes almost all of New Albany and some unincorporated areas.

Schools
New Albany High School (Formerly W. P. Daniel High School, opened 1962) 
New Albany Middle School
New Albany Elementary School

Demographics

2006-07 school year
There were a total of 2,201 students enrolled in the New Albany School District during the 2006–2007 school year. The gender makeup of the district was 48% female and 52% male. The racial makeup of the district was 34.58% African American, 58.75% White, 5.95% Hispanic, and 0.73% Asian. 45.6% of the district's students were eligible to receive free lunch.

Previous school years

Accountability statistics

See also
List of school districts in Mississippi

References

External links
 

Education in Union County, Mississippi
School districts in Mississippi